Toshiki Ishikawa (石川俊輝 | born 10 July 1991 in Saitama, Saitama, Japan)  is a Japanese football player who currently plays for Omiya Ardija. 

He has played for Shonan Bellmare and Omiya Ardija.

Club career statistics
Updated to end of 2018 season.

Achievements
Shonan Bellmare
J2 League (2): 2014, 2017
Ventforet Kofu
Emperor's Cup (1): 2022

References

External links
Profile at Shonan Bellmare

 

1991 births
Living people
Toyo University alumni
Association football people from Saitama Prefecture
Japanese footballers
J1 League players
J2 League players
Shonan Bellmare players
Omiya Ardija players
Ventforet Kofu players
Association football midfielders